Goniastrea favulus, also known as the lesser star coral, is a species of stony coral in the family Merulinidae. It occurs in shallow water in the Indo-Pacific region. This is an uncommon species of coral and the International Union for Conservation of Nature has rated its conservation status as being "near threatened".

Description

Colonies of Goniastrea favulus usually form greenish or brownish massive boulder-like structures. The polyps are either arranged in groups within a common corallite wall, or are in meandroid valleys. The walls of the corallites are thin, the septa bear large paliform lobes and there is a small central collumella.

Distribution and habitat
Goniastrea favulus is native to theIndo-Pacific region. Its range extends from northern Madagascar and the eastern coast of Africa to the Maldive Islands, southeastern Asia, Japan, Australia and island groups in the Pacific Ocean. It is found in the intertidal and subtidal zones on fore and hind reef slopes, and in lagoons.

Ecology
Goniastrea favulus is a zooxanthellate species of coral, containing in its tissues many microscopic symbiotic dinoflagellates which during the day provide the coral with the products of photosynthesis. During the night, the polyps expand and extend their tentacles to catch zooplankton.

Colonies of Goniastrea favulus are simultaneous hermaphrodites and spawn once a year. Spawning is a synchronised event with all the colonies in a locality releasing their gametes into the sea at much the same time. The sperm is released in a jet while the eggs are negatively buoyant and surrounded by mucous and adhere to the colony. Although a majority of the eggs are cross-fertilised, a large number are self-fertilised. This is in contrast to the closely related Goniastrea aspera, in which species both eggs and sperm are released in discrete buoyant packets which float to the surface. The clusters soon break apart and fertilisation then occurs, resulting in a much higher percentage of cross-fertilised eggs.

References

Merulinidae
Corals described in 1846